Øgderen is a lake in the municipalities of Aurskog-Høland in Akershus county and Trøgstad in Østfold county, Norway.

See also
List of lakes in Norway

Lakes of Viken (county)
Aurskog-Høland
Trøgstad